The Navigator is an opera by Liza Lim to a libretto by Patricia Sykes. The work had its world premiere at the Judith Wright Arts Centre as part of the Brisbane Festival 2008 on 30 July 2008. It lasts for about 100 minutes without an interval.

The work was developed during Lim's stay in 2007/2008 in Berlin; on 9 March 2008, excerpts were performed with the ELISION ensemble conducted by Simon Hewett at the MaerzMusik Festival, part of the Berliner Festspiele.

Theme

Roles

References

Operas
English-language operas
2008 operas
Operas by Liza Lim
One-act operas